The Translators Association of China (TAC) is a national association for translation studies in China. Founded in the 1980s TAC was part of the academic response to the national Economic Reform in 1978. The incumbent President of TAC's 6th Executive Committee is the former Chinese Foreign Minister Li Zhaoxing, who in the meantime chairs the Foreign Affairs Committee of China.

TAC routinely hosts annual national symposium on varied topics related to translation and interpretation theories and practices. To facilitate the academic communication, it publishes bi-monthly periodical Chinese Translators Journal since 1983. In addition, the Association regulates the domestic translation service market through its Translation Service Committee, which was set up in 2003, in order to promote ethical business practices.

TAC joined the International Federation of Translators (FIT) in 1987. As a co-founder of the FIT Asian Translators Forum, it hosted the first Forum session in 1995. Besides, it has formed strategic alliance with overseas academic societies, such as the Netherlandish translation innovation think tank TAUS. In 2011, shortly after that TAC was admitted as associate member of the CIUTI, it held the CIUTI Forum 2011 in Beijing, which was co-sponsored by CIUTI and BFSU.

Awards

Han Suyin Award for Young Translators
The Han Suyin Award for Young Translators, founded in 1986.

Chinese Translation Culture Lifetime Achievement Award
Lifetime Achievement Award in Translation (TAC), it is one of the most prestigious translation prizes in China, it was first awarded in 2006.

Competent Translator
The Competent Translator, it was first awarded in 2004.

Past Winners:

 Li Wenjun, American literature translator
 Zi Zhongyun, American literature translator
 Shao Mujun, American literature translator
 Mei Shaowu, American literature translator
 Tu An, English literature translator
 Huang Ai, English literature translator
 Xu Yuanchong, English literature and French literature translator
 Yang Jingyuan, English literature translator
 Wen Meihui, English literature translator
 Wu Junxie, English literature translator
 Zheng Yonghui, French literature translator
 Gui Yufang, French literature translator
 Liu Banjiu, German literature translator
 Wen Jieruo, Japanese literature and English literature translator
 Ye Weiqu, Japanese literature translator
 Zhang Lin, Korean literature translator
 Zhang Hongnian, Persian literature translator
 Yi Lijun, Polish literature translator
 Xie Sutai, Russian literature translator
 Meng Guangjun, Russian literature translator
 Gao Mang, Russian literature translator
 Tian Dawei, Russian literature translator
 Lu Yongfu, Russian literature translator
 Zheng Xuelai, Russian literature translator
 Wei Huangnu, Russian literature translator
 Wu Mengchang, Russian literature translator
 Sun Shengwu, Russian literature translator
 Xu Leiran, Russian literature translator
 Liu Anwu, Indian literature translator
 Jin Dinghan, Hindi literature translator
 Yu Hong, Spanish literature translator
 Wang Yizhu, Greek literature, Latin literature, English literature, French literature, German literature, Japanese literature, Russian literature and Spanish literature translator
 Su Hang
 Li Yeguang
 Wu Mingqi

Official Journal
 Chinese Translators Journal, founded in 1980.

China Accreditation Test for Translators and Interpreters
The China Accreditation Test for Translators and Interpreters (CATTI), which was launched in 2003 by the Ministry of Personnel of the People’s Republic of China, is considered the most authoritative national level translation and interpretation proficiency qualification accreditation test in the People’s Republic of China. It has been designed to assess the proficiency and competence of professional Chinese translators and interpreters in an objective, scientific and fair manner. The test for interpreters consists of two parts: Interpreting Comprehensive Aptitude and Interpreting Practice. The Interpreting Practice in the test for Interpreters of Level 2 consists of two specialties: Consecutive Interpreting and Simultaneous Interpreting, while the test for translators consists of two parts: Translating Comprehensive Aptitude and Translating Practice.

The test for Interpreting Comprehensive Aptitude proceeds by listening to a tape and answering questions in writing as required. Consecutive Interpreting and Simultaneous Interpreting in the Interpreting Practice in the test for Interpreters of Level 2 and the Interpreting Practice in the test for Interpreters of Level 3 proceed by on-site recording. The time for the Interpreting Comprehensive Aptitude and Consecutive Interpreting and Simultaneous Interpreting in the Interpreting Practice in the test for Interpreters of Level 2 is 60 minutes. The time for Interpreting Practice for Interpreters of Level 3 is 30 minutes. In order to renew a members CATTI certification continuing education credits given through training from the Translators Association of China, must be earned every three years.

According to Vivi's Chinese Interpreters and Translation, a worldwide team of Chinese interpreters and translators, the CATTI certification is the most difficult of the main translation and interpreting certification programs in China, in fact in the 11 years since certification began in 2003, the average pass rate for the exam has only been about 11%, with, as of 2013, only about 35,000 people having received certificates of the 295,000 that have sat the exam since its inception.

On the afternoon of November 27, the 2014 Salon of TAC Translation Services Committee was held in Beijing. Its main topic was the study on the work and industry development ideas of TAC Translation Services Committee in the next and future years. Guo Xiaoyong, the First Administrative Vice-chairman of TAC and Head of TAC Translation Services Committee, and Lin Guofu, the Vice-chairman of TAC and Administrative Deputy Head of TAC Translation Services Committee hosted the salon. About 20 representatives from TAC, China Translation & Publishing Corporation, Sichuan Lan-bridge, Jinan Sunther, CSIC, Petrostar, East-juntai, Spirit Translation, Central Compilation and Translation Bureau, Beijing Shiji Tongwen and other enterprises & public institutions attended the salon.

According to the spirit of the Notice on Carrying out the Industry Exchange Activities in the Form of Salon among the translation service companies throughout the country determined in the Fourth Joint Meeting of the Third Director and Secretary-General Leadership of TAC Translation Services Committee and to promote cooperation and development in the translation service industry around the country, TAC Translation Services Committee organized two salon activities in Beijing respectively in November 2012 and December 2013, which had been welcomed and supported by the industry. Those salon participants highly appreciated the job done by TAC Translation Services Committee in 2014 during the discussion, especially the compilation work of Quotation Standards of Written Translation and Quotation Standards of Interpretation Services and the successful Ninth National Seminar on Translation Management Work. They also briefly reviewed the work by the current committee in the past years and raised recommendations and hope for the next committee. They believed that with the rapid development of social organization reform and language service, TAC Translation Services Committee should make more effort in the aspect of industry research, regulating the market, developing industry standards and improving service. This salon was full of warm atmosphere, and those representatives spoke out freely, saying that they would like to make their due share to developing our translation service industry and promoting the work of TAC Translation Services Committee.

See also
Machine translation in China

References

External links
 National Conference on Translation 30th Anniversary of Translators Association of China

Professional associations based in China
Translation studies
Translation associations